The Masovian Voivodeship was a voivodeship of the Congress Poland, that existed from 1816 to 1837. Its capital was Warsaw. It was established on 16 January 1816, from the Warsaw Department and the three counties of the Bydgoszcz Department, and existed until 23 February 1837, when it was replaced by the Masovian Governorate. During the January Uprising, the Polish National Government, announced the re-establishment of the voivodeships with the borders from 1816, reestablishing the administration of the Masovian Voivodeship within the part of Warsaw Governorate. It existed from 1863 to 1864, when it was abolished, and replaced by the Warsaw Governorate.

Subdivisions 
 Gostynin District (seat: Kutno)
 Gostynin County (seat: Gostynin)
 Orłów County (seat: Kutno)
 Kuyavian District (seat: Włocławek)
 Brześć Kujawski County (seat: Włocławek)
 Kowal County (seat: Kowal)
 Radziejów County (seat: Radziejów)
 Łęczyca District (seat: Łęczyca)
 Łęczyca County (seat: Łęczyca)
 Zgierz County (seat: Zgierz)
 Rawa District (seat: Rawa)
 Brzeziny County (seat: Brzeziny
 Rawa County (seat: Rawa)
 Sochaczew District (seat: Sochaczew)
 Sochaczew County (seat: (Sochaczew)
 Stanisławów District (seat: Mińsk Mazowiecki)
 Siennica County (seat: Siennica)
 Stanisławów County (seat: Stanisławów)
 Warsaw District
 Błonie County (seat: Błonie)
 Czersk County (seat: Czersk)
 Warsaw County (seat: Warsaw)

Citations

Notes

References 

Voivodeships of the Congress Poland
History of Masovia
History of Warsaw
States and territories established in 1816
States and territories disestablished in 1837
States and territories established in 1863
States and territories disestablished in 1864
1863 establishments in Poland